Kaikawala is a village in Sri Lanka. It is located within Central Province. It is the birthplace of national politicians: P. B. Kaviratne, and Sanjeeva Kaviratne.

See also
List of towns in Central Province, Sri Lanka

External links

Populated places in Matale District